Chrysogonum perrieri  is a species of plants in the family Asteraceae. It is found only in Madagascar.

References

Heliantheae
Endemic flora of Madagascar
Plants described in 1923
Taxa named by Jean-Henri Humbert